Kevin Barney Rollins (born November 15, 1952) is an American businessman and philanthropist. The former President and CEO of Dell Inc., in 2006 Rollins was named by London's CBR as the 9th Most Influential person in the Enterprise IT sector.

Rollins was born and raised in Utah and met his wife, Debra, while attending Brigham Young University (BYU).  While at BYU, Rollins earned a bachelor's degree in humanities and civil engineering in 1983 and an MBA a year later. Before joining Dell in April 1996, Rollins was vice president and partner of Bain & Company where he specialized in strategies and management for high technology and consumer product clients. He helped develop strategies that propelled Dell into a commanding position in the direct selling of computer systems in the United States.

Rollins became the chairman of the American Enterprise Institute's Board of Trustees on January 1, 2009.

Dell Computer
Rollins worked at Dell for over a decade in various positions, including Senior VP of Corporate Strategy (1996), president of Dell Americas (1996–2001) overseeing operations in the United States, Canada, Mexico, and Latin America, COO (2001–2004), president (2001–2007), and CEO (2004–2007). During the last four quarters of his leadership, the company employed approximately 50,000 workers worldwide and reported revenues of $45.4 billion.

While at Dell, Rollins oversaw company plans to spend more on staff training and customer services, and sales increased $14.2 billion—up 6% year on year with a net income of $762 million. He also announced that Dell would add support for AMD chips. In 2006, Forbes magazine listed Rollins as the 18th highest compensated CEO in the world at $39.31 million for achieving a 9% decline in stock performance during his tenure with a stock performance that was 81 percent that of the S&P 500. 
He also oversaw one of the largest layoffs that Dell had until then (2006–2007) of 8000 people worldwide. There was resentment at his below-par decisions and execution, which could have contributed to his removal from Dell. Rollins was fired from Dell in January, 2007.

Upon leaving Dell in 2007, Rollins was paid $48.5 million in cash related to expired stock options. On July 22, 2010 Rollins was among current and former Dell executives charged by the SEC in a fraudulent accounting case. The case was settled with Rollins reportedly paying $4 million.

Philanthropic efforts
Rollins is a member of the BYU's President's Leadership Council and the Marriott School National Advisory Council, where he founded and continues to fund the Rollins Center for Entrepreneurship and Technology. He also serves at the request of the President of the United States on the Advisory Committee for Trade Policy and Negotiation and is a member of the Computer Systems Policy Project and the U.S. Business Council. Rollins is also active in the American Enterprise Institute and the Juvenile Diabetes Research Foundation.

His philanthropy has also extended to financially support various political campaigns, including most recently Mitt Romney's bid for the Republican nomination for the U.S. Presidency.

Appointments and awards 
Utah Information Technology Hall of Fame (Inducted in 2004)
BYU President's Leadership Council Executive Committee Member
BYU eBusiness Center Advisory Board Executive Committee Member
BYU Marriott School National Advisory Council, Public Relations Committee Member
Austin Symphony Orchestra Board of Directors (Member At-large)
KRLU Public Television Board of Directors
U.S. Presidential Advisory Committee for Trade Policy and Negotiation Member
2006 BYU Marriott School of Management Convocation speaker

Personal life
Rollins and his wife have four children and nine grandchildren. In 2019, he put a residence in Del Valle, Texas on the market, after he had it custom built in 2005 by architect David Webber.

Notes

External links
 
 BYU Rollins Center for Entrepreneurship and Technology

1952 births
American computer businesspeople
American Latter Day Saints
American philanthropists
Brigham Young University alumni
Dell people
Living people
TPG Capital people
Bain & Company employees
American chief operating officers